Alwin Kloekhorst (born in Smilde, 1978) is a Dutch linguist, Indo-Europeanist and Hittitologist.

Biography 
Kloekhorst received his Ph.D. in 2007 at Leiden University for his thesis on Hittite. In over 1200 pages, his dissertation describes the history of Hittite in the light of its Indo-European language origin. Part One, Towards a Hittite Historical Grammar, contains a description of Hittite phonology and a discussion of the sound laws and morphological changes that took place between the Proto-Indo-European and Hittite. Part Two, An Etymological Dictionary of the Hittite Inherited Lexicon, contains etymological treatments of all Hittite words of Indo-European origin. One of the dissertation's most important conclusions is the confirmation that the Anatolian languages split from Proto-Indo-European before all other Indo-European branches, which have undergone a period of common innovations (see Indo-Hittite). The thesis was published in the Leiden-based Indo-European Etymological Dictionary project.

Works 
 Kanišite Hittite: The Earliest Attested Record of Indo-European, 2019, Leiden – Boston, xii + 303 pp.
 Accent in Hittite: A Study in Plene Spelling, Consonant Gradation, Clitics, and Metrics (= Studien zu den Boğazköy-Texten 56), Wiesbaden, 2014, xxxvi + 716 pp.
 Etymological Dictionary of the Hittite Inherited Lexicon (= Leiden Indo-European Etymological Dictionary Series 5), 2008, Leiden – Boston, xiii + 1162 pp.
 Hethitische Texte in Transkription. KBo 35 (= Dresdner Beiträge zur Hethitologie 19), 2006, Wiesbaden, xiv + 353 pp. (together with D. Groddek)

References
 Personal webpage

External links
 The Hittite Inherited Lexicon

1978 births
Living people
Linguists from the Netherlands
Hittitologists
Leiden University alumni
People from Midden-Drenthe
Paleolinguists
Linguists of Indo-Uralic languages
Linguists of Indo-European languages
Indo-Europeanists